The 1941 Youngstown Penguins football team was an American football team that represented Youngstown University (now known as Youngstown State University) as an independent during the 1941 college football season.  In its third season under head coach Dike Beede, the team compiled an undefeated 7–0–1 record. The team played its home games at Rayen Stadium in Youngstown, Ohio.

Schedule

References

Youngstown
Youngstown State Penguins football seasons
College football undefeated seasons
Youngstown Penguins football